Giulio Prandi is an Italian conductor and musicologist. He specializes in baroque music and is the conductor of the Ghislieri Choir and Consort at the Ghislieri College in Pavia.

Discography
Giacomo Antonio Perti Cantate morali e spirituali Op.1, Gloria Banditelli Yetsabel Fernandez Arias - Arion Consort & Choir, Giulio Prandi2 CDs. Amadeus Italy 2010
Niccolò Jommelli Sacred Music: Emanuela Galli, Romina Basso, Francesca Boncompagni, Ghislieri. Priandi (DHM) 
Baldassare Galuppi Sacred music: Roberta Invernizzi, Romina Basso, Krystian Adam, Ghislieri. Priandi (DHM) 
Davide Perez Mattutino de' Morti: Roberta Invernizzi, Salvo Vitale, Ghislieri Choir, Ghislieri Consort, Giulio Prandi DHM

References

External links
Ghislieri College - Music (Italian)
Interview of Giulio Prandi on Classicagenda (French)

Living people
Year of birth missing (living people)